Garry Who (born Garry Weston, 1 May 1954) is an Australian actor and comedian, best known for his role as Doug Stevens in the Australian sitcom All Together Now.

Career
Beginning his working life as a signwriter, Who began his career in the mid-70s as a stand-up comedian. He rose to prominence in the early 1980s at the original Sydney Comedy Store. In the late 1980s he began to feature on film and television.

His biggest role to date was portraying Doug Stevens in the 90's hit All Together Now. He has also appeared in A Country Practice, Pizza, Swift and Shift Couriers, Water Rats, The Hollowmen, and Housos.

Works

Discography
1987 Life’s Just A Routine

Filmography

Television
A Country Practice (as Spanner Dooley) (1985)
Just for the Record (Host) (1988–1989)
Midday (resident comedian) (1989–1995)
All Together Now (as Doug Stevens) (1991–1993)
G.P. (as Jason Powell) (1996)
Big Sky (as Ivan) (1997)
Water Rats (as John Lynch) (1998)
Pizza (various characters) (2003–2007)
The Hollowmen (as Real Estate Agent) (2008)
Swift and Shift Couriers (as Gary Hibbett) (2008)
All Saints (as Jim Patterson) (2009)
Housos (as Cop Garry) (2011–2013)

References

External links
Official website

1954 births
Male actors from Sydney
Australian stand-up comedians
Australian male comedians
Australian male television actors
Living people